The 2019–20 Colgate Raiders men's basketball team represented Colgate University during the 2019–20 NCAA Division I men's basketball season. The Raiders, led by ninth-year head coach Matt Langel, played their home games at Cotterell Court in Hamilton, New York as members of the Patriot League. They finished the season 25–9, 14–4 in Patriot League play to win the Patriot League regular season championship. They defeated Lehigh and Lafayette to reach the championship game of the Patriot League tournament where they lost to Boston University. As a regular season league champion who failed to win their league tournament, they received an automatic bid to the 2020 National Invitation Tournament. However, the NIT and all other postseason tournaments were cancelled amid the COVID-19 pandemic.

Previous season
The Raiders finished the 2018–19 season 24–11, 13–5 in Patriot League play to earn a share of the regular season championship. As the No. 1 seed in the Patriot League tournament, they defeated Boston University, Navy, and Bucknell to win the tournament championship. As a result, the received the conference's automatic bid to the NCAA tournament as the No. 15 in the South region. There they lost to Tennessee in the first round.

Roster

Schedule and results

|-
!colspan=9 style=| Non-conference regular season

|-
!colspan=9 style=| Patriot League regular season

|-
!colspan=9 style=| Patriot League tournament

References

Colgate Raiders men's basketball seasons
Colgate
Colgate
Colgate